If I Ran the Zoo is a children's book  written by Dr. Seuss in 1950.

The book is written in anapestic tetrameter, Seuss's usual verse type, and illustrated in Seuss's pen-and-ink style.

Plot 
When young Gerald McGrew visits the zoo, he discovers that the exotic animals are "not good enough". He says that if he ran the zoo, he would set all of the current animals free and find new, more bizarre and exotic ones. Throughout the book he lists these creatures, starting with a lion with ten feet and escalating to more imaginative (and imaginary) creatures, such as the Fizza-ma-Wizza-ma-Dill, "the world's biggest bird from the island of Gwark, who eats only pine trees, and spits out the bark". 

The illustrations also grow wilder as McGrew imagines going to increasingly remote and exotic habitats, capturing each fanciful creature, and bringing them all back to a zoo now filled with his new wild animals. He also imagines the praise he receives from others, who are amazed at his "new Zoo, McGrew Zoo".

Adaptation 
Some of the animals featured in If I Ran the Zoo have been featured in a segment of The Hoober-Bloob Highway, a 1975 CBS TV special. In this segment, Hoober-Bloob babies don't have to be human if they don't choose to be, so Mr. Hoober-Bloob shows them a variety of different animals, including ones from If I Ran the Zoo (and On Beyond Zebra!). Such animals include: Obsks, a flock of Wild Bippo-No-Bungus, a Tizzle-Topped Tufted Mazurka, a Big-Bug-Who-Is-Very-Surprising, Chuggs, a Deer with Horns-That-Are-Just-A-Bit-Queer, a New Sort-Of-A-Hen, an Elephant-Cat, and an Iota.

"Nerd" 
If I Ran the Zoo is often credited with the first printed modern English appearance of the word "nerd", although the word is not used in its modern context. It is simply the name of an otherwise un-characterized imaginary creature, appearing in the sentence "And then, just to show them, I'll sail to Ka-Troo/And Bring Back an It-Kutch, a Preep, and a Proo,/A Nerkle, a Nerd, and a Seersucker too!"

Theme park attraction

Dr. Seuss's Zoo book is also the main theme for one of the children's play areas at Universal Studios' Islands of Adventure. The small play area is located inside the area of the park known as Seuss Landing.

Criticism 
If I Ran the Zoo has been criticized for its use of racial stereotypes and caricatures. In a 1988 biography of Dr. Seuss, Ruth K. MacDonald notes the perceived  presence of "occasional stereotypes of native peoples—potbellied, thick-lipped blacks from Africa, squinty-eyed Orientals", that may offend some modern readers. A 2019 study published in the journal Research on Diversity in Youth Literature noted the perceived presence of dehumanizing stereotypes of East Asian, Sub-Saharan African and Middle Eastern characters. The Canadian Book and Periodical Council's Freedom to Read project listed the book as having been challenged in 2015 for insensitivity and ethnic stereotyping.

On March 2, 2021, Dr. Seuss Enterprises withdrew If I Ran the Zoo and five other books from publication due to controversy surrounding racist images within those books. Dr. Seuss Enterprises did not specify which illustrations were offensive, but since the book is about animals being collected from all over the world, several nations are depicted in stereotypical ways, for example Nepalese, Chinese, African Pygmys, Persian, Turkish, and Cossack characters.

See also

 If I Ran the Circus

References

Books by Dr. Seuss
Islands of Adventure
Universal Parks & Resorts attractions by name
Amusement rides introduced in 1999
1950 children's books
Caldecott Honor-winning works
American picture books
Novels set in zoos
Random House books
Works originally published in Redbook
Race-related controversies in literature
Stereotypes of black people
Stereotypes of East Asian people